Laura Machesky FRSE FMedSci is a British-American cancer research scientist currently based in the University of Cambridge. Professor Machesky is the Sir William Dunn Professor of Biochemistry in the  Department of Biochemistry, and the current president of the British Society for Cell Biology.

Career 
Originally from Michigan, Machesky moved to Cambridge University in 2022. Before this she was an MRC Career Development Fellow, MRC Senior Research Fellow and Professor of Cell Biology at the School of Biosciences, University of Birmingham from 1999 to 2007, a Medical Research Council (MRC) senior research fellow and Professor of Cell Biology at the Beatson Institute for Cancer Research in Glasgow from 2007 to 2022, and director of the Institute of Cancer Sciences at the University of Glasgow from 2020 to 2022.

Research interests 
Machesky's research group specialises in cancer cell migration, invasion, metastasis and the energetics of cell biology.  She discovered the 7-subunit Arp2/3 complex and showed that this was a major regulator of actin dynamics and cell migration. According to the Academy of Medical Sciences, this work "changed the way the field understood fundamental principles of signalling to actin dynamics and impacted on biomedical problems such as host-pathogen interactions, endocytic trafficking, phagocytosis and cancer cell invasion".

Awards and honours 
Machesky was elected as a Member of the European Molecular Biology Organisation in 2012, a Fellow of the Royal Society of Edinburgh in 2014, and a Fellow of the Academy of Medical Sciences in 2016. 
Her husband Robert Insall is also a Fellow of the Royal Society of Edinburgh and a professor at the University of Glasgow.

References 

Year of birth missing (living people)
Living people
Fellows of the Royal Society of Edinburgh
Fellows of the Academy of Medical Sciences (United Kingdom)